The Battle of Määritsa, or the Battle of Osula, was a battle in Osula village, at that time in Võru County, Estonia. It began on the night of 31 March 1946, involving members of the Forest Brothers and Soviet occupation forces. Seven Estonian fighters based at the Hindrik farmhouse were besieged by up to 300 Soviet soldiers. The battle lasted about seven hours before the farmhouse caught fire and the Soviets demanded that the rebels surrender. Only two fighters managed to escape alive from the farmhouse, but were subsequently killed in battle with the besiegers.

References

Battles in Estonia
Battles involving the Soviet Union
Cold War military history of the Soviet Union
Occupation of the Baltic states
Battles involving Estonia
Conflicts in 1946
1946 in Estonia
Võru Parish
Battles post-1945
March 1946 events in Europe
Estonian Soviet Socialist Republic